Michael Henry Zemski (born 10 August 1953) is a former Australian rules footballer who played with Hawthorn in the Victorian Football League (VFL) and Preston and Prahran in the Victorian Football Association (VFA).

Zemski later played with and briefly coached AJAX Football Club in the Victorian Amateur Football Association. He is also a former leading athlete who represented Australia at the Maccabiah Games.

References

Sources
 Atkinson, G. (1982) Everything you ever wanted to know about Australian rules football but couldn't be bothered asking, The Five Mile Press: Melbourne. .
Holmesby, Russell & Main, Jim (2007). The Encyclopedia of AFL Footballers. 7th ed. Melbourne: Bas Publishing.

External links
 
 
 Michael Zemski's playing statistics from the VFA Project

1953 births
Living people
Australian rules footballers from Victoria (Australia)
Hawthorn Football Club players
People educated at Camberwell Grammar School
Preston Football Club (VFA) players
Maccabiah Games competitors for Australia